Alonso Piola (born 1 November 1979) is an Italian Brazilian footballer who plays as a forward. He is a relative of the former Italian footballer Silvio Piola.

Career
Piola started his career in Italy with Internazionale. He was loaned to Gualdo, then to Austrian club Tirol Innsbruck., Pro Sesto (along with Luca Anania) and Sassuolo along with Daniele Ricci. Piola returned to Inter in January, and then left for Castel di Sangro of Serie C2. In 2004–05 season he left for Challenge League side Wohlen.

In May 2007 Piola returned to his hometown club Concórdia for 2007 Campeonato Catarinense Divisão de Acesso and 2009 Campeonato Catarinense Divisão Especial.

In May 2010 he left Concórdia for Juventude of Santa Catarina.

References

External links
Profile at Swiss Football League 
 Profile at CBF 

Brazilian footballers
Brazilian expatriate footballers
Italian footballers
Italian expatriate footballers
Inter Milan players
S.S.D. Pro Sesto players
U.S. Sassuolo Calcio players
FC Wohlen players
Expatriate footballers in Austria
Expatriate footballers in Switzerland
Italian expatriate sportspeople in Austria
Italian expatriate sportspeople in Switzerland
Association football forwards
Sportspeople from Santa Catarina (state)
Brazilian people of Italian descent
1979 births
Living people